Sasagi Sánchez (born June 3, 1994) is a Mexican professional baseball relief pitcher for the Diablos Rojos del México of the Mexican League.

Career

Acereros de Monclova
On April 4, 2014, Sánchez signed with the Acereros de Monclova of the Mexican League. In his rookie season, Sánchez made 34 appearances for Monclova, posting a 3-2 record and 5.05 ERA. In 2015, Sánchez pitched in only 9 games with the team, registering a 1-2 record and 4.09 ERA. The following season, Sánchez logged a 2-6 record and 4.98 ERA in 24 appearances for the team.

Pericos de Puebla
On March 28, 2017, Sánchez was traded to the Pericos de Puebla alongside Juan Avila in exchange for Hector Galvan, Henry Garcia, Jaime Lugo, Julio Felix, Oscar Sanay, Rogelio Bernal, and Sergio Perez. In 5 games with the Pericos, Sánchez struggled to a 15.19 ERA.

Acereros de Monclova (second stint)
On May 1, 2017, Sánchez was traded back to the Acereros de Monclova in exchange for Henry Garcia. He pitched in 2 games for Monclova, recording a 3.00 ERA with 4 strikeouts in 3.0 innings of work.

Olmecas de Tabasco
On May 21, 2017, Sánchez was loaned to the Olmecas de Tabasco of the Mexican League. He finished the year with Tabasco, pitching in 36 games and posting a 2.93 ERA with 19 strikeouts.

Pericos de Puebla (second stint)
On September 11, 2017, Sánchez was returned to the Pericos de Puebla. Sánchez pitched in 46 games for the team in 2018, posting a 2-5 record with 43 strikeouts. In 2019, Sánchez pitched in 59 games for the Pericos, recording a 4-3 record and 7.51 ERA with 41 strikeouts in 50.1 innings of work.

Diablos Rojos del México
On December 11, 2019, Sánchez was traded to the Acereros de Monclova alongside Bernardo Heras and Sergio Perez in exchange for Issmael Salas and Mark Serrano. On March 9, 2020, Sánchez was traded to the Diablos Rojos del México of the Mexican League. Sánchez did not play in a game in 2020 due to the cancellation of the Mexican League season because of the COVID-19 pandemic.

International career
Sánchez was selected to the Mexico national baseball team at the 2020 Summer Olympics (contested in 2021).

References

External links

1994 births
Living people
Acereros de Monclova players
Venados de Mazatlán players
Pericos de Puebla players
Olmecas de Tabasco players
Tomateros de Culiacán players
Diablos Rojos del México players
Baseball pitchers
Baseball players from Sinaloa
Sportspeople from Mazatlán
Baseball players at the 2020 Summer Olympics
Olympic baseball players of Mexico